Sông Mã is a rural district of Sơn La province in northwest Vietnam. As of 2019, the district had a population of 154,224. The district covers an area of 1,658 km2. Sông Mã is the district capital.

Administrative divisions
Sông Mã is divided into 19 commune-level sub-divisions, including the township of Sông Mã and 18 rural communes (Bó Sinh, Chiềng Cang, Chiềng En, Chiềng Khoong, Chiềng Khương, Chiềng Phung, Chiềng Sơ, Đứa Mòn, Huổi Một, Mường Cai, Mường Hung, Mường Lầm, Mường Sai, Nà Nghịu, Nậm Mằn, Nậm Ty, Pú Bẩu, Yên Hưng).

References

Districts of Sơn La province
Sơn La province

ms:Daerah Song Ma
vi:Sông Mã